The Dream Team is a 2012 French comedy film directed by Olivier Dahan.

Plot
Patrick Orbéra (José García), a former footballer who turned alcoholic enlists his old teammates to the local team to raise money and save jobs.

Cast 
 José García - Patrick Orbéra
 Jean-Pierre Marielle - Titouan Leguennec
 Franck Dubosc - David Léandri
 Gad Elmaleh - Rayane Ziani
 Joeystarr - Shaheef Berda
 Ramzy Bedia - Marandella
 Omar Sy - Wéké N'Dogo
 Frédérique Bel - Floria
 Chantal Neuwirth - Nénène
 Jean Reno - Himself
 Claudia Tagbo - Fatou N'Dogo
 Riton Liebman - The bailiff
 Arnaud Henriet - The lawyer

References

External links 

2012 comedy films
2012 films
Films directed by Olivier Dahan
French comedy films
2010s French-language films
2010s French films